José Luis Asturias (unknown – unknown), was a Guatemalan chess player, seven times Guatemalan Chess Championship winner (1926, 1927, 1928, 1929, 1930, 1931, 1932).

Biography
José Luis Asturias was the strongest chess player in Guatemala at the turn of the 1920s–1930s. From 1926 to 1932 he won 7 national championships in a row.

José Luis Asturias played for Guatemala in the Chess Olympiad:
 In 1939, at second board in the 8th Chess Olympiad in Buenos Aires (+2, =2, -11).

References

External links

José Luis Asturias chess games at 365chess.com

Year of birth missing
Year of death missing
Guatemalan chess players
Chess Olympiad competitors
20th-century chess players